Old City Hall, located at Chestnut and 5th Streets in the Independence Hall complex of Independence National Historical Park in Center City Philadelphia, was built in 1790–91 in the Federal style. The architect was David Evans, Jr. 

Originally intended as Philadelphia's City Hall, it housed the U.S. Supreme Court from the completion of its construction in 1791 until 1800, when the national capital was moved to Washington, D.C. Three chief justices, John Jay (Jay Court), John Rutledge (Rutledge Court), and Oliver Ellsworth (Ellsworth Court), officiated the Supreme Court from this location.

After the national capital moved to Washington, D.C., the building continued to serve as Philadelphia's City Hall until 1854. It is a contributing property to Independence National Historical Park and is owned by the City of Philadelphia, which leases the building to the National Park Service.

See also

References

External links

Old City Hall - Independence National Historical Park (Official Website)

1791 establishments in Pennsylvania
18th-century architecture in the United States
Buildings and structures in Independence National Historical Park
City and town halls in Pennsylvania
City and town halls on the National Register of Historic Places in Pennsylvania
Federal architecture in Pennsylvania
Former seats of local government
Government buildings completed in 1791
Historic American Buildings Survey in Philadelphia
Historic district contributing properties in Pennsylvania
History museums in Pennsylvania
History of the Supreme Court of the United States
Museums in Philadelphia